George Henry Hunter (July 8, 1887 in Buffalo, New York – January 11, 1968 in Harrisburg, Pennsylvania) was a pitcher and an outfielder in Major League Baseball. He played for the Brooklyn Superbas during the 1909 and 1910 baseball seasons. His twin brother Bill played for the Cleveland Naps during the 1912 season.

References

External links

1887 births
1968 deaths
Baseball players from New York (state)
Major League Baseball pitchers
Major League Baseball outfielders
Brooklyn Superbas players
Wilkes-Barre Barons (baseball) players
Nashville Vols players
Montreal Royals players
Elmira Colonels players
Twin sportspeople